Heary is a surname. Notable people with the surname include:

Owen Heary (born 1976), Irish footballer
Thomas Heary (born 1979), Irish footballer

See also
Leary (surname)